Denisova Cave is a cave in the  Bashelaksky Range of the Altai mountains, Siberia, Russia. The cave has provided items of great  paleoarchaeological and  paleontological interest. Bone fragments of the Denisova hominin originate from the cave, including artifacts dated to around 40,000 BP.  A 32,000-year-old prehistoric species of horse has also been found in the cave.

The cave is located in a region thought to have been inhabited concurrently in the past by Neanderthals and by modern humans. A bone needle dated to 50,000 years ago was discovered at the archaeological site in 2016 and has been described as the most ancient needle known (though another possible needle dates to about 10,000 years earlier from South Africa from  61,000 years ago). 

Denisovans, Neanderthals and related hybrids may have inhabited the Denisova Cave for extended periods, but perhaps not at the same time. The attribution of the needle and certain other artifacts at the cave, whether to Homo sapiens or to the Denisova hominin (also sometimes known as Homo denisova), is uncertain.

Description
The cave is composed of three galleries. It has been described both as a karst cave and as a sandstone cave.

Cave sediments are rich with remnants of animals, including extinct ones. Remains of 27 species of large and medium-sized mammals have been found, (such as cave hyena, cave lion, etc.) and 39 species of small mammals, as well as remnants of reptiles, 50 bird species and other vertebrates. Pollen in the cave sediments is used for palaeoclimatological research.

History
In the 18th century, the cave was inhabited by an Old Believer hermit, Dyonisiy (Denis), and was named after him, while the indigenous Altay people call it Ayu-Tash (Bear Rock). 

In the 1970s, Russian scientists discovered paleoarcheological remains in the cave that led to further explorations. So far, 22 strata have been identified, with archeological artifacts that cover the time from Dyonisiy back to about 125,000–180,000 years ago. The dating of the strata was accomplished by the use of thermoluminescence dating of sediments, or, in some cases, radiocarbon dating on charcoal.

Among the archeological artifacts are Mousterian- and Levallois-style tools attributed to Neanderthals. Beside tools, researchers found decorative objects of bone, mammoth tusk, animal teeth, ostrich egg shell, fragments of a stone bracelet made of drilled, worked, and polished dark green chlorastrolite, and pendants. A  sewing needle made from bird bone, estimated to be around 50,000 years-old, was found in Denisova Cave. The cave also contains stone tools and bone artifacts made by modern humans, and Pääbo commented: "The one place where we are sure all three human forms have lived at one time or another is here in Denisova Cave."

Denisovans, Neanderthals and related hybrids, may have inhabited the Denisova Cave over thousands of years, but it is unclear whether they ever shared the cave.

In 2019, a team of archaeologists from the Novosibirsk Archeology and Ethnography Institute discovered a 45,000-year-old cave lion statue made from woolly mammoth tusk, according to The Siberian Times. This 42 mm long, 8 mm thick and 11 mm high figurine was unearthed in the eleventh layer of the southern gallery of Denisova Cave. According to Siberian archeologists, this statue made by Upper Palaeolithic artist might be the oldest animal figurine in the world. The lion's hind legs, groin, back and belly are covered with eighteen rows of notch ornaments and its head is missing. On the right side of the lion there are two extra rows with four notches.

Archaeogenetics
The average annual temperature of the cave remains at 0 °C (32 °F), which has contributed to the preservation of archaic DNA among the remains discovered.

Denisova hominin

Scientists from the Institute of Archaeology and Ethnology of Novosibirsk have investigated the cave. Among the artifacts which had been left about 30,000 to 48,000 years ago (strata 9–11), bones were identified. One of these bones was a piece of phalanx of a child found in layer 11.2 of the East Gallery. The fossil element was analyzed by Svante Pääbo and coworkers from the Max Planck Institute for Evolutionary Anthropology in Leipzig; its mitochondrial DNA revealed a structure that differs from known human patterns and has been ascribed to "Denisova hominin". Pääbo and his co-workers first intended to classify the Denisovans as a separate species but changed their minds prior to publication of the results.  Further analysis revealed the Denisovans were related to the Neanderthals and interbred with the ancestors of modern Melanesians.

Neanderthal remains: the Altai Neanderthal

In 2010, a toe bone was discovered in the cave, in layer 11.4 of the East Gallery, and therefore contemporary with the Denisovan finger bone. Preliminary characterization of the bone's mitochondrial DNA suggested it belonged to a Neanderthal, not a Denisovan. Later analysis confirmed the toe bone as coming from a Neanderthal. The first high-coverage genome of Neanderthals was taken from this toe bone.

This Neanderthal is referred to as the Altai Neanderthal. The Altai Neanderthal is estimated to be around 120,000 years old. Other Neanderthals for which nuclear DNA has been recovered are all genetically closer to each other than to the Altai Neanderthal. Modern humans and Ust'-Ishim man share more alleles with all other Neanderthals than with the Altai Neanderthal, which shows that the introgression event from Neanderthals into humans likely took place after the split of the lineage of the Altai Neanderthal from that of other Neanderthals.

Denisova 11: a first-generation Neanderthal and Denisovan hybrid

The use of collagen peptide mass fingerprinting of ancient bone samples, called Zooarchaeology by Mass Spectrometry (ZooMS),  for species identification allowed the sorting of 2,315 unidentified bone fragments from 2012 or 2014 excavation. One sample, DC1227 (Denisova 11), taken from layer 12 of the East Gallery, carried human traits. This was the first time that this technique was used to successfully identify the presence of an extinct human. Further analysis showed the bone fragment to have Neanderthal mitochondrial DNA (mtDNA).

Whole genome sequencing and other characterization of Denisova 11 to 2.6-fold coverage showed this specimen belonged to a female at least thirteen years old at the time of death.  Denisova 11 was found to be the hybrid progeny of a Neanderthal mother and a Denisovan father.  Comparing the entire genome against all archaic hominin genomes on record, Denisova 11 shares the most genetic affinity with Denisova 3, indicating that her Denisovan father is more closely related to Denisova 3 than her mother was to any of the sequenced Neanderthals.  Like Denisova 3, this father carries some
introgressed Neanderthal DNA from an admixture event far in the past, estimated at more than 300 generations earlier, and similar in sequence to the Altai Neanderthal genome.  However, the mother of Denisova 11 was genetically closer to Neanderthal specimen Vindija 33.19 from Vindija Cave in Croatia and to other sequenced Neanderthal individuals than to the Altai Neanderthal.  This suggests a migration or population turnover involving the Neanderthal populations of the region surrounding the Denisova cave.

DNA from soil
Sequencing of DNA from soil samples taken from Denisova Cave showed the presence of Neanderthal and Denisovan mtDNA from several samples, as well as the DNA of several animals. Neanderthal mtDNA was present in soil samples from layer 15 of the Main Gallery, a layer associated with Paleolithic artifacts where no Neanderthal fossils have been found. Neanderthal and Denisovan mtDNA were present in samples from layers 14 and 15, respectively, from the East Gallery, lower than any previous fossil finds.

Ovodov horse
MtDNA has also been recovered from an equid fossil, dating to around 32,000 years ago, taken from Denisova Cave. The equid fossil was identified as coming from Equus ovodovi (Ovodov horse), an extinct species first described based on a 40,000 year old fossil taken from Proskuryakova Cave in Khakassia, Russia. The mtDNA of the Denisova sample shows close affinity for that taken from Proskuryakova Cave. DNA analysis places Equus ovodovi as a phylogenetically basal group for non-caballine horses, with closest genetic affinity with zebras.

Fossils 
So far, the fossils of six distinct individuals from Denisova Cave have been identified through their DNA. Four of the individuals, Denisova 2, Denisova 3, Denisova 4 and Denisova 8 are classified as Denisovans. Denisova 2 and Denisova 3 are young females, while Denisova 4 and Denisova 8 are adult males. mtDNA analysis of the Denisovan individuals suggests that Denisova 2 is the oldest, followed by Denisova 8, while Denisova 3 and Denisova 4 are roughly contemporaneous.

One of the individuals, the Altai Neanderthal, is a Neanderthal woman. Before its DNA was sequenced, the Altai Neanderthal had been given the provisional name of Denisova 5. In 2018, Denisova 11 was identified as a Neanderthal/Denisova hybrid, based on whole genome sequencing and comparisons.

During DNA sequencing, Denisova 2, Denisova 4 and Denisova 8 yielded low-coverage genomes, while Denisova 3 and the Altai Neanderthal yielded high-coverage genomes.

See also 
 Clovis culture

References

External links

 Denisova Cave – abode of mysterious hominin

1970s archaeological discoveries
Archaeological sites in Siberia
Prehistoric sites in Russia
Neanderthal sites
Caves of Russia
Geography of Altai Krai
Landforms of Altai Krai
Mousterian
Cultural heritage monuments in Altai Krai
Objects of cultural heritage of Russia of federal significance